Tsubasa: Reservoir Chronicle is a fantasy adventure manga series written by Clamp that is currently serializing in Kodansha's Weekly Shōnen Magazine which began publication in 2003. Set in a multiverse, its storyline follows a group of five travelers as they journey across the dimensions in search of Sakura's memories. It was adapted by Bee Train into a fifty-two episode anime television series directed by Kōichi Mashimo and partly by Hiroshi Morioka with music direction by Toru Nakano. The first season was broadcast in 2005 spanning twenty-six episodes. Production I.G adapted the series into an anime film directed by Itsuro Kawasaki and music direction by Kazuhiro Iwabayashi, that premiered in 2006. The second season of the anime series followed the film in 2006 spanning the last twenty-six episodes. Production I.G. adapted an additional two OVA series directed by Shunsuke Tada with music direction for the first OVA by Masafumi Mima that aired between 2007 and 2009 spanning five episodes in total. The discography for these adaptations consist of four soundtrack albums, one compilation album, eight maxi singles, two studio albums, and three drama CDs.

The core of the discography is the four soundtrack albums released by Victor Entertainment between 2005 and 2006, which together contain the original soundtrack for both seasons of the anime television series. The lyrics, arrangement, and composition for the soundtrack albums are provided by Yuki Kajiura who has provided the background music for anime series such as Madlax, Noir, and .hack//SIGN. The eight maxi singles released by both Victor Entertainment and R and C Limited between 2005 to 2006 and two studio albums released by Victor Entertainment during 2009 each contain one piece of theme music used in the various adaptations of the manga series. A vocal compilation album collecting various songs from the studio albums, maxi singles, and drama CDs released between 2005 to 2006.

Three drama CDs have been released by Victor Entertainment between 2005 and 2006 featuring dialogue between the characters from Tsubasa: Reservoir Chronicle voiced by their respective voice actors as well as theme music provided by various artists and performed by a varying combination of the series' five protagonists. Another three drama CDs have been released between 2006 and 2007, with a fourth to be released in 2009, that follow a spin-off storyline featuring characters from both Tsubasa: Reservoir Chronicle and its sister manga series, xxxHolic.

Concept and creation

When watching Tsubasa Chronicle, Maaya Sakamoto felt that Syaoran's straightforward feelings and strength to protect Sakura were very touching. Within "Kazemachi Jet", the ending theme of second season of the anime television series Tsubasa Chronicle, she tried to capture the image of Syaoran growing from his "naive" self into a young man as a result of experiencing the repetition of meetings and partings over his journey and Syaoran continuing to try to protect his loved one in spite of the mishaps along the way. In "Spica", an insert song into Tsubasa Chronicle that was sold alongside "Kazemachi Jet", she tried to capture the Sakura's feminine and maternal strength as one with courage to continually move forward despite the odds but also ability to show weakness at times. In "Saigo no Kajitsu", the ending of the OVA series Tsubasa Tokyo Revelations, she worked once more with Shōko Suzuki whom she had been with for three years prior and thus was very comfortable working with. She described having created the song as beginning quietly and building up into a magnificent and dramatic song as a wave washes over the surface of still water. She wrote its lyrics trying to capture the feelings of the characters who learn that the Syaoran whom they had been traveling with was in reality a copy and their desire to continue to choose their own future despite knowing the reason why Syaoran was cloned and what they would face by choosing to continuing their journey.

Kinya Kotani has been a fan of Clamp's work for quite some time and was extremely happy when he could take part in creating the theme music for adaptations of the group's work. When Kinya Kotani wrote the lyrics for the theme music for Tsubasa Chronicle and the anime film Tsubasa Chronicle the Movie: The Princess of the Country of Birdcages as if he were Syaoran. Kotani had to deliver both "Blaze" and "Aerial"—the opening themes for the first season of the anime series and the opening for the anime film respectively—on a tight schedule. When first creating "Aerial", he described always having the word "aerial" in his mind. He wrote the lyrics by comparing the universe of Tsubasa Chronicle with the everything that he had written so far. When creating the opening theme song "It's" for the second season of the anime, he tried to capture the sad feel of Syaoran's strength in his singing; he tried to create a clear image of Syaoran's feelings in writing the song's lyrics, both Syaoran's forwarding-facing and backward-facing characteristics. The music was designed to be simple but deep, conveying a sense of something missed and of something new. Kotani feels that "It's" is a song that conveys the feeling of one's back being propelled into a journey. For the film Yuki Kajiura was asked to create a score different from the one used in TV series in order to convey characters' states of mind. Producer Tetsuya Natakate was satisfied with the result, as Kajiura's music ended being what he hoped.

Season 1

"Blaze"
"Blaze" is a maxi single performed by Kinya Kotani first released on June 22, 2005 by R and C under the catalog number YRCN-10092. The lyrics, composition, and arrangement for the single are provided by Kinya Kotani, Nieve, and HΛL. It contains 3 tracks in regular and instrumental versions. The track "Blaze" is featured as the opening theme to the first season of the anime series Tsubasa Chronicle. Its B-side is titled "Refraction". Lesley Smith of Anime Fringe described "Blaze" as "an upbeat example of J-pop at its finest". It peak ranked 19th on the Oricon singles chart and remained on the chart for five weeks.

"Loop"
 is a maxi single performed by Maaya Sakamoto first released on May 11, 2005 by Victor Entertainment under the catalog number VICL-35791. The lyrics, composition, and arrangement for the single are provided by h's, Maaya Sakamoto, h-wonder, and Takeshi Nakatsuka. It contains 4 tracks in regular and instrumental versions and covers a duration of 18:08. The track "Loop" was featured as the ending theme to the first season of the anime series Tsubasa Chronicle. Its B-side is titled . Lesley Smith of Anime Fringe described "Loop" as "a powerful ballad, with slight Celtic overtones and a gorgeous melody". It peak ranked 7th on the Oricon singles chart and remained on the chart for nine weeks.

Future Soundscape I
Future Soundscape I is one of the four soundtrack albums for the anime television series Tsubasa Chronicle. The lyrics, composition, and arrangement for the album are provided by Yuki Kajiura except for the included pieces of theme music. It features the opening and ending themes for the first season as well as English versions of two of Sakura's image songs: "You Are My Love" performed by Eri Itō and "Yume no Tsubasa" (titled "Tsubasa" for this album) performed by FictionJunction KAORI. It spans 20 tracks and covers a duration of 54:59. It was first released on July 6, 2005 by Victor Entertainment with the catalog number VICL-61661. The limited edition of the album was released on the same day by Victor Entertainment with the catalog number VIZL-137 that features a wide book-case design showing Syaoran holding a golden staff and a pen with Sakura's feather attached to its end.

It peak ranked 39th on the Oricon albums chart and remained on the chart for three weeks. Lesley Smith from webzine Anime Fringe praised it as "a beautiful CD" that has "enchanting" music and "amazing vocals", "round[ing] off ... nicely" with the track "Loop". She praised the music as having a unique fusion of different instruments and giving creating an image or impression appropriate to how it was used in the anime, noting that the female choral back some of the best pieces of the track. However, she criticized "You Are My Love" for being sung badly.

Future Soundscape II
Future Soundscape II is one of the four soundtrack albums for the anime television series Tsubasa Chronicle. The lyrics, composition, and arrangement for the album are provided by Yuki Kajiura. It features performance by Eri Itō, FictionJunction KEIKO, and Makino Yui. The album features two character image songs: Oruha's image song titled  performed by FictionJunction KEIKO and Sakura's original image song titled "Yume no Tsubasa" performed by Yui Makino as Sakura. It spans 18 tracks and covers a duration of 51:57. It was first released on September 22, 2005 by Victor Entertainment under the catalog number VICL-61662. The limited edition of the album was released on the same day by Victor Entertainment under the catalog number VIZL-145, featuring a notebook titled "Tsubasa Note". It peak ranked 92nd on the Oricon albums chart and remained on the chart for two weeks.

Tsubasa Chronicle the Movie: The Princess of the Country of Birdcages

Aerial
"Aerial" is a maxi single performed by Kinya Kotani first released on August 17, 2005 by R and C under the catalog number YRCN-10108. The lyrics, composition, and arrangement for the single are provided by Kinya Kotani and HΛL. It contains 3 tracks in both regular and instrumental versions. The track "Aerial" was featured as the opening theme to the anime film Tsubasa Chronicle the Movie: The Princess of the Country of Birdcages. Its B-side is titled "Season". It peak ranked 45th on the Oricon singles chart and remained on the chart for three weeks.

"Amrita"
 is a maxi single performed by Yui Makino first released on August 18, 2005 by Victor Entertainment under the catalog number VICL-35846. The lyrics, composition, and arrangement for the single are provided by Caoli Cano, Yui Makino, Tetsushi Fujita, Taguchi Toshi, and Sonic Dove. It contains 4 tracks in both regular and instrumental versions. The song "Amrita" was featured as the ending theme to the second season of the anime film Tsubasa Chronicle the Movie: The Princess of the Country of Birdcages. It peak ranked 53rd on the Oricon singles chart and remained on the chart for five weeks.

Season 2

"It's"
"It's" is a maxi single performed by Kinya Kotani first released on May 24, 2006 by R and C under the catalog number YRCN-10138. The lyrics, composition, and arrangement for the single are provided by Taguchi Toshi, Mikio Sakai, Ayuko Akiyama, and Teppei Shimizu. It contains 3 tracks in both regular and instrumental versions. The track "It's" was featured as the opening theme to the second season of the anime series Tsubasa Chronicle. The single's B-side is titled  It peak ranked 63rd on the Oricon singles chart and remained on the chart for three weeks.

"Kazemachi Jet / Spica"
 is a double A-side maxi single performed by Maaya Sakamoto first released on June 14, 2006 by Victor Entertainment under the catalog number VICL-36059.  The lyrics, composition, and arrangement for the single are provided by Maaya Sakamoto, Shōko Suzuki, Takehiro Iida, h-wonder, and Udai Shika. It contains 4 tracks in both regular and instrumental versions. The A-side track "Kazemachi Jet" was featured as the ending theme while the second A-side track "Spica" was featured as an insert to episode 43 of the second season of the anime series Tsubasa Chronicle and were meant to represent the perspectives of the two protagonists of Tsubasa: Reservoir Chronicle, Syaoran and Sakura respectively. It peak ranked 14th on the Oricon singles chart and remained on the chart for six weeks.

Future Soundscape III
Future Soundscape III is one of the four soundtrack albums for the anime television series Tsubasa Chronicle. The lyrics, composition, and arrangement for the album are provided by Yuki Kajiura except the pieces of theme music featured in the second season of the anime. It features the short versions of the opening and ending themes for the second season of the anime as well as performance by Eri Itō and FictionJunction KAORI. It was first released on July 5, 2006 by Victor Entertainment under the catalog number VICL-61966. The limited edition of the album was released on the same day by Victor Entertainment under the catalog number VIZL-189, featuring a mini clear pouch and a wide book-case design. It peak ranked 83rd on the Oricon albums chart and remained on the chart for two weeks.

Future Soundscape IV
Future Soundscape IV is one of the four soundtrack albums for the anime television series Tsubasa Chronicle. The lyrics, composition, and arrangement for the album are provided by Yuki Kajiura except the pieces of theme music featured in the first season of the anime. It features performance by Eri Itō and FictionJunction Yuuka. It spans 20 tracks and covers a duration of 58:21. It was first released on September 21, 2006 by Victor Entertainment under the catalog number VICL-62084. The limited edition of the album was released on the same day by Victor Entertainment under the catalog number VIZL-203, featuring came with a mousepad and housed in a special package. It peak ranked 80th on the Oricon albums chart and remained on the chart for one week.

Tsubasa Tokyo Revelations

"Synchronicity"
"Synchronicity" is a maxi single performed by Yui Makino first released on November 21, 2007 by Victor Entertainment under the catalog number VTCL-35007. The lyrics, composition, and arrangement for the single are provided by Yuki Kajiura, Makino Yui, Caoli Cano and Shunsuke Takizawa. It contains 3 tracks in both regular and instrumental versions. The track "Synchronicity" was featured as the opening theme to the OVA adaptation Tsubasa Tokyo Revelations. Its B-side is titled . Its peak ranked 49th on the Oricon singles chart and remained on the chart for three weeks.

"Saigo no Kajitsu / Mitsubachi to Kagakusha"
 is a maxi single performed by Maaya Sakamoto first released on November 21, 2007 by Victor Entertainment under the catalog number VTCL-35008. The lyrics, composition, and arrangement for the single are provided by Maaya Sakamoto, Shōko Suzuki, Neko Saito, and Solaya. It contains 5 tracks in regular, short, and instrumental versions and covers a duration 19:48. The track "Last Fruit" is featured as the ending theme to the OVAs Tsubasa Tokyo Revelations. It peak ranked 19th on the Oricon singles chart and remained on the chart for seven weeks.

Tsubasa Shunraiki

Kazeyomi
 is a studio album performed by Maaya Sakamoto first released on January 14, 2009 by Victor Entertainment bearing the catalog number VTCL-60085. The limited edition of the album was released on the same day by Victor Entertainment bearing the catalog number VTZL-8 that includes a bonus region 2 DVD featuring three music videos. It contains 14 tracks. The track "Sonic Boom" is featured as the opening theme to the OVA series Tsubasa Shunraiki. It peak ranked 3rd on the Oricon albums chart and remained on the chart for seven weeks.

Everlasting Songs
Everlasting Songs is a first studio album under the FictionJunction name and was first released on February 25, 2009 by Victor Entertainment with the catalog number VTCL-60106. It contains 15 tracks whose lyrics, composition, and arrangement are provided by Yuki Kajiura with performance provided by the singers of Kajiura's FictionJunction solo project: Asuka Kato (FictionJunction Asuka), Kaori Oda (FictionJunction KAORI), Keiko Kubota (FictionJunction Keiko), Wakana Ootaki (FictionJunction Wakana), Yuuka Nanri (FictionJunction Yuuka), and Yuriko Kaida. It is the first album of where all of the singers of FictionJunction have participated in a single album. The track  performed by FictionJunction is the ending theme to the OVA series Tsubasa Shunraiki. It peak ranked 27th on the Oricon albums chart and remained on the chart for one week.

{| class="collapsible collapsed" border="0"
! style="width:16em; text-align:left" |Track listing
! | 
|-
| colspan="2" | 
{|class="wikitable"
|-
! #
! Title
! Vocalist
! Original vocalist  Original album
! Length
|-
| 1
| "Hoshikuzu"  
| Kaori Oda, Keiko Kubota
| Noriko Ogawa  Fantasy Sound & Reading: The Velveteen Rabbit (disc 1 ~ fantasy reading tracks)
| 
|-
| 2
| "Kioku no Mori"  
| Yuuka Nanri
| 
| 
|-
| 3
| "Dream Scape"
| Kaori Oda
| Kaori Oda  Future Soundscape III
| 
|-
| 4
| "Gin no Hashi"  
| Kaori Oda, Keiko Kubota, Wakana Ootaki
| Minami Omi  Aquarian Age ~ Sign For Evolution Sphere.4 Influential E.G.O
| 
|-
| 5
| "Kaze no Machi e"  
| Keiko Kubota
| Keiko Kubota  Future Soundscape II
| 
|-
| 6
| "Here We Stand in the Morning Dew"
| Yuriko Kaida
| Saeko Chiba  Sayonara Solitia
| 
|-
| 7
| "Synchronicity"
| Keiko Kubota
| Yui Makino  Synchronicity
| 
|-
| 8
| "Hanamori no Oka""  
| Kaori Oda
| Kaori Oda  <small>'</small>
| 
|-
| 9
| "Mizu no Akashi"  
| Wakana Ootaki
| Rie Tanaka  Chara de Rie
| 
|-
| 10
| "Cazador Del Amor"| Yuuka Nanri
| 
| 
|-
| 11
| "Himitsu"  
| Yuriko Kaida
| Aya Hisakawa  blanc dans NOIR: Kuro no Naka no Shiro
| 
|-
| 12
| "Hōseki"  
| Keiko Kubota
| Marina Inoue  Hōseki
| 
|-
| 13
| "Yume no Tsubasa"  
| Kaori Oda
| Yui Makino  Future Soundscape II
| 
|-
| 14
| "Michiyuki"  
| Kaori Oda
| Kaori Hikita  Tsuki no Curse
| 
|-
| 15
| "Everlasting Song"' (Japanese version)
| Asuka Kato
| 
| 
|}
|}

Compilation albums

Best Vocal Collection
 is a compilation album that collects the "best" theme music, insert songs, character songs, and background music from the anime television series Tsubasa Chronicle and its adaptation into drama CDs. It was first released on December 20, 2006 by Victor Entertainment with the catalog number VICL-62166. It spans 14 tracks and covers a duration of 1:01:45. The only original work in the soundtrack is "Tsuki no Shijima", a Japanese vocal song performed by Yui Makino with lyrics, composition, and arrangement all provided by Yuki Kajiura that was featured in the anime series Tsubasa Chronicle as an insert song. The album peak ranked 103rd on the Oricon albums chart and remained on the chart for three weeks.

Drama CDs
Three drama CDs adaptations of the anime series Tsubasa Chronicle have been released by Victor Entertainment between 2005 and 2006. Some time after leaving Koryo Country, the group of five protagonists arrive in a dimension where the King Yukito, the same Yukito seen in Clow Country, is troubled by an unfeeling heart and is the only one in the country who could open the door to one of Sakura's feathers. All of the releases charted on the Oricon charts for a single week, with the highest ranking album being "The Matinée of the Palace" Chapter.2 ~Impossible Goal~ peak ranking at 161st. Additionally, a spin-off series of three drama CDs titled "Private High School Holitsuba" have been released between 2006 and 2009.

"The Matinée of the Palace" Chapter. 1 ~Coral, the City on the Water~
 is a drama CD adaptation of the anime television series Tsubasa Chronicle first released on December 16, 2005 by Victor Entertainment under the catalog number VICL-61794. It contains 7 tracks and covers a duration of 26:12. It features two pieces of theme music in both original and instrumental versions and three tracks of dialogue between Syaoran, Sakura, Kurogane, Fay D. Flourite, Mokona, Tōya, and Yukito with background music taken from the anime.  is the opening theme performed by Tetsu Inada.  is the ending theme performed by Yui Makino. Additionally, the CD features an original two-page card-shaped calendar. It peak ranked 165th on the Oricon albums chart and remained on the chart for one week.

Some time after leaving Koryo Country, Syaoran, Sakura, Kurogane, Fay, and Mokona arrive in a new dimension where a single island is surrounded by a vast sea. Sensing a strong magical presence they believe to be one of Sakura's feathers, they enter the city where they meet King Yukito and his servant Tōya, the same characters as those found in Clow Country. Although King Yukito is the only one in the country able to open the door to the room that may hold Sakura's feather, he is no longer able to feel any emotion. In order to get hold of the feather, Fay suggests they help Tōya revive Yukito's heart by performing a play.

"The Matinée of the Palace" Chapter. 2 ~Impossible Goal~
 is a drama CD adaptation of the anime television series Tsubasa Chronicle first released on February 1, 2006 by Victor Entertainment under the catalog number VICL-61851. It contains 7 tracks and covers a duration of 31:04. It features two pieces of theme music in both original and instrumental versions and three tracks of dialogue between Syaoran, Sakura, Kurogane, Fay D. Flourite, Mokona, Tōya, and Yukito with background music taken from the anime.
 is the opening theme performed by Miyu Irino. "Smile" is the ending theme performed by Daisuke Namikawa. Additionally, the CD features an original two-page card-shaped calendar. It peak ranked 161st on the Oricon albums chart and remained on the chart for one week.

Fay writes a play that is essentially a reenactment of the group's journey. In that play, Syaoran and Sakura must confess their love for each other. However, Sakura is unable to say words during practice and also when they perform the play in front of Yukito and Tōya.

"The Matinée of the Palace" Chapter. 3 ~Unspeakable Lines~
 is a drama CD adaptation of the anime television series Tsubasa Chronicle first released on March 24, 2006 by Victor Entertainment under the catalog number VICL-61897. It contains 7 tracks and covers a duration of 31:14. It features two pieces of theme music in both original and instrumental versions and three tracks of dialogue between Syaoran, Sakura, Kurogane, Fay D. Flourite, Mokona, Tōya, and Yukito with background music taken from the anime.  is the opening theme and is performed by Mika Kikuchi.  is the ending theme and is performed by Miyu Irino and Yui Makino. Additionally, the CD features an original two-page card-shaped calendar. It peak ranked 226th on the Oricon albums chart and remained on the chart for one week.

During the play, as Sakura is unable to say that she likes Syaoran, the two decide to instead improvise and speak from the heart. However, this causes Sakura to remember her past although she soon forgets her recollection due to Yūko's magic. Upon hearing their situation, Yukito once more feels sadness and decides to reveal that he sealed his heart, the presence Mokona felt earlier, so as not experience the pain of having a distant relationship with Tōya, his childhood friend. The group then leave for another world.

Private High School Holitsuba series
The first three CDs were released to the applicant readers of the Weekly Shōnen Magazine in which Tsubasa: Reservoir Chronicle is serialized and of the Young Magazine in which xxxHolic is serialized. The first, titled , was released during July 2006.  followed during October 2006. The third CD, titled , followed on August 22, 2007 in Shōnen Magazine and on August 27 in Young Magazine. A fourth CD, was released to customers who bought all four DVDs of the xxxHolic and Tsubasa: Reservoir Chronicle 2009 OVA adaptations, xxxHolic Shunmuki and Tsubasa Shunraiki respectively. The series has also been adapted to short manga one-shots by Clamp.

Release history

Albums

Singles

Reception
The musical score for the anime adaptation have generally received praise by critics. N.S. Davidson of IGN described the soundtrack as some of "some of the most glorious and touching music to be found in anime". Mania Entertainment's Chris Beveridge described the background music as "beautiful" and Bryan Morton of Mania Entertainment described the score as "another excellent soundtrack by Yuki Kajiura". Anime News Network's Carl Kimlinger agreed with Beveridge and Morton, however described the musical score as "apocalyptic" and "gloomy", ill-suited to the mood of the anime that helped transform the "what should have been a breezy lark ... into something muddy, ponderous, and far too serious-minded". However, both Beveridge and IGN's Chris Wyatt noted that the bass levels were overwhelming at times.

The anime's first season's theme music have received good reviews whereas the second season's theme music have not. Anime Fringe Lesley Smith described the first season's theme opening as providing a "breathtaking" introduction to the anime, taking the listener through a journey to unknown worlds similar to what the protagonists of Tsubasa: Reservoir Chronicle'' do. She described the first season's ending theme as "gorgeous" with "amazing" vocals and "lyrics [that] fit the song perfectly".

References

External links
List of Tsubasa Chronicle Albums @ NHK 
List of Tsubasa Chronicle Albums @ Victor Entertainment 
List of Tsubasa Chronicle Albums @ Victor Entertainment 
Yuki Kajiura and FictionJunction @ Victor Entertainment 
Yuki Kajiura and FictionJunction website 
Maaya Sakamoto website 
Kinya Kotani website 
Yui Makino website 

Anime soundtracks
Discographies of Japanese artists
Film and television discographies